Jim Heath most often refers to:
 James R. Heath, chemist (born 1962)
 The Reverend Horton Heat, musician (born 1959)

Jim Heath may also refer to:
 James Heath (historian) (1629–1664), English royalist historian
 James Heath (golfer) (born 1983), English golfer
 Sir James Heath, 1st Baronet (1852–1942), British Conservative Member of Parliament
 James Heath (engraver) (1757–1834), English engraver
 Jamey Heath (active since 1997), Canadian political activist
 James E. Heath (active since 1834), first editor of the Southern Literary Messenger
 James Heath (boxer) (born 1960), American boxer
 James P. Heath (1777–1854), U.S. congressman from Maryland
 Jimmy Heath (1926–2020), American jazz musician
Jim Heath (American football) (born 1956), former American football player and coach
Jim Heath, a character in 1925 American film serial Ace of Spades